Vinay Lamba is an Indian former first-class cricketer who played for Delhi and current chairman of selection committee of the Delhi District Cricket Association.

Career
An opening batsman, Lamba appeared in 76 first-class and 4 List A matches, representing Delhi between the 1967/68 and 1980/81 seasons. He has also played for North Zone and Indian Universities. He scored more than 3000 runs including five hundreds in his first-class career.

Lamba became a match referee after retirement, officiating in domestic matches in India. He was part of the five-member senior team selection panel of Delhi District Cricket Association before he was made the head of Delhi's under-19 selection committee in 2009. He later returned to the senior team selection panel, and holds the position of Delhi's senior team selection committee chairman as of December 2015.

References

External links 
 
 

Living people
Indian cricketers
Delhi cricketers
Indian Universities cricketers
North Zone cricketers
Year of birth missing (living people)